Atomic Ritual is the third studio album from stoner rock band Nebula, released in 2003 by Liquor and Poker and Sweet Nothing Records. The album was reissued in 2022 by the band's current label, Heavy Psych Sounds Records.

Track listing
All songs written by Eddie Glass and Ruben Romano except where noted.
 "Atomic Ritual" – 4:14
 "So It Goes" (Ruben Romano) – 3:54
 "Carpe Diem" – 4:21
 "More" (Glass, Judgement of Paris) – 3:15
 "The Beast" – 3:35
 "Out of Your Head" – 4:11
 "The Way to Venus" – 2:46
 "Paradise Engineer" – 4:10
 "Electric Synapse" – 3:00
 "Strange Human" – 5:05
 "Fin" (Ruben Romano) – 2:43
 "Atomic Ritual Revisited" - 9:13 (hidden track)

Personnel
Eddie Glass – guitar, vocals, keyboards, bass, drums, percussion
Ruben Romano – drums, vocals, keyboards, guitar, percussion, artwork
Simon Moon – bass

Reception

Atomic Ritual was released to warm critical praise, with AllMusic calling Nebula a "hard-working power trio [that] sounds like it has been hanging out in the garage since 1973, blissfully unaware of the changing world outside. Which is definitely to its benefit".

Trivia
Some copies of the CD come with a Liquor and Poker sticker. On one of the flaps of the album case there are 5 lines of text reading:
"In the years of the Primal Course, in the dawn of terrestrial birth,Man Mastered the mammoth and horse, and Man was the lord of the earth."
"He made him a hollow skin from the heart of a holy tree,He compassed the earth therein, and Man was lord of the Sea."
"He controlled the vigour of steam, he harnessed the lightning for hire;He drove the celestial team, and Man was the lord of Fire."
"Deep-mouthed from their thrones deep-seated, the choirs of the aeons declareThe last of the demons defeated, for Man is the lorde of the Air."
"Arise, O Man, in thy strength! the kingdom is thine to inheritTill the high gods witness at length that Man is the lord of his spirit."

Underneath this the initials A.C. are printed. These are the initials of occultist Aleister Crowley, the author. This is not Nebula's only Aleister Crowley reference; their MySpace tagline is a direct quote from Crowley: "Do what thou wilt, shall be the whole of the law."

"So It Goes" is featured on the soundtrack to Tony Hawk's Underground 2. It also contains references to Kurt Vonnegut's book Slaughterhouse-Five.

References

2003 albums
Nebula (band) albums
Albums produced by Chris Goss